Salitre Canton is a canton of Ecuador, located in the Guayas Province.  Its capital is the town of Salitre.  Its population at the 2001 census was 50,379.

Demographics
Ethnic groups as of the Ecuadorian census of 2010:
Montubio  79.5%
Mestizo  15.9%
Afro-Ecuadorian  2.6%
White  1.8%
Indigenous  0.1%
Other  0.1%

References

Cantons of Guayas Province